Alejandro Pereyra Doria Medina (born 24 February 1981) is a Bolivian poet and filmmaker. He was born in Sucre, Bolivia, lived in Mexico, Brazil and Germany for many years, and now lives in Bolivia. His 2009 feature film Verse was selected for the 2010 Zero Latitude Film Festival Ecuador and the 2011 Festival Del Cinema Latino Americano Trieste.

Filmography
 2009 Verse
 2011 Mirar

See also
 Cinema of Bolivia

References

External links

1981 births
Spanish-language film directors
Living people
Bolivian film directors
Bolivian screenwriters
Male screenwriters